Flamborough Head may refer to:

 Flamborough Head, a promontory in Yorkshire, England, UK
 RAF Flamborough Head, a British Royal Air Force base
 HMS Flamborough Head, a British Royal Navy ship
 Battle of Flamborough Head, a naval battle
 Flamborough Head Lighthouse

See also
 Flamborough (disambiguation)
 HMS Flamborough Prize
 Empire Flamborough